The Newburgh, Dutchess and Connecticut Railroad, originally the  Dutchess and Columbia Railroad and affectionately "The Never Did and Couldn't", is a link in the New York, New Haven and Hartford Railroad system in New York state.

History

Beginnings
The Dutchess and Columbia Railroad was chartered September 4, 1866. It was to run from Fishkill northeast and north to meet the New York and Harlem Railroad at Craryville. Millbrook resident, George H. Brown, was elected president. The road was promoted largely by New York bankers who had financial interests in the town of Washington. Several Dutchess County towns along the proposed route bonded themselves to aid in the construction of the road. Hesitation on the part of Columbia County townships to do likewise, together with the influence of some politicians in the northern section of Dutchess County, caused the promoters to change the route to turn east at Pine Plains, going over the mountains to Millerton by way of Bethel, Shekomeko and Winchells. It was also extended to State Line to connect with the Connecticut Western.

Construction began in 1868, and teams of horses pulled wagon loads of rails to be distributed along the right of way from Little Plum Point (Dutchess Junction) through Matteawan, Glenham, Fishkill and Brinckerhoff to near Old Hopewell. Bridges were built over Fishkill Creek and Sprout Creek. After this section was in place more rails would be hauled by trains to complete the line. The line reached north to Pine Plains by July 1, 1869. Construction reached Millerton in the northeast corner of the county in November 1871.

Operations

Clove Branch Railroad
A short four-mile connecting Railroad called the Clove Branch was chartered in 1868 and opened in 1869. The CB connected with the D&C near Old Hopewell, and its main purpose was to haul iron ore out of the mine at Sylvan Lake. Later the CB was extended another four miles and ran passenger and freight service to a few customers and an iron furnace in Clove Valley. The president was the same George H. Brown who was President of the D&C RR. Operations were suspended in 1897 and it was abandoned in 1898.  traces of the Clove branch right-of-way are still visible west  of Poughquag, NY, and the iron smelter it served in Clove Valley is still standing.

Boston, Hartford and Erie Railroad
The Boston, Hartford and Erie Railroad was formed from three separate companies:
The Providence and Plainfield Railroad, chartered in June 1846, would run from Providence to the Rhode Island/Connecticut state line;
The Hartford and Providence Railroad, incorporated in May 1847, would continue west to Hartford, Connecticut;
 The New York and Hartford Railroad, chartered and incorporated in May 1845, would continue to the New York and Harlem Railroad at Brewster, New York.

In 1849, the two Connecticut companies merged to form the Hartford, Providence and Fishkill Railroad, with a modified charter to continue past Brewster to Fishkill, New York on the Hudson River. In 1851 the Rhode Island company was merged into it. Later that year the first section opened, from Hartford east to Willimantic. Extensions opened east to Providence in 1854 and west to Waterbury in 1855. The HP&F went bankrupt on January 1, 1858, and was run by the trustees until 1863, when it was leased by the newly formed Boston, Hartford and Erie Railroad. In May 1863, the Boston, Hartford and Erie Railroad was chartered to take over operations of the failed lines and continue the line west to Fishkill, New York, with a car float from there to the Erie Railroad at Newburgh. On December 1865 a number of Erie Railway men were elected to the BH&E board, placing it under partial control of the Erie.

The BH&E planned to connect New England cities with a shipping terminal on the Hudson River, and purchased property at Dennings Point adjacent to the Dutchess Junction starting point of the D&C RR. In November 1868, with approximately eleven miles of track built, D&C President George H. Brown leased the entire operation of the D&C to the BH&E, providing that D&C complete construction of the line.

The D&C RR continued building the line and bought a used locomotive from a railroad in Pennsylvania naming it "Tioronda". It was a 4-4-0 wood burner that had been built in 1856. It arrived at Dutchess Junction on 8 February 1869. Later it purchased two more from New Haven. These were named "Washington" and "Pine Plains" for the towns which the D&C/BH&E ran through. The chocolate brown coaches were lettered BH&E Railroad. The station at Plum Point/Dutchess Junction was not yet completed so on Monday, 21 June 1869 the first trip on the line left Fishkill Landing. They ran south along the Hudson River line to Plum Point/Dutchess Junction and then ran east on the new rail line. Trains used this route for a short time in 1869 until the station was finished at Dutchess Junction. By the winter of 1869/70 the rails had reached Bangall.

Dutchess and Columbia Railroad

In November 1871 the Connecticut Western Railroad leased the short part of the D&C from the state line to the New York and Harlem Railroad at Millerton. Also using the line was the Poughkeepsie and Eastern Railroad, completed in 1872. The P&E obtained trackage rights over the part D&C line from Stissing Junction north to Pine Plains, in order to connect sections of its own line.
The Putnam & Dutchess Railroad Company, was incorporated in 1871 to construct a road from the New York and Boston Railroad in Carmel to the D&C near Hopewell;
The New York and Boston was incorporated in 1869 to construct a railroad from the Harlem River northerly to Lake Mahopac, near Brewster.

On November 18, 1872 these two roads were consolidated with the D&C as the New York, Boston & Northern Railroad Company with plans to run track from New York City north into Vermont and on to Montreal.

The Lebanon Springs Railroad Company and the Bennington and Rutland Railroad Company combined in 1870 to form the Harlem Extension Railroad which then absorbed the Pine Plains and Albany in 1873. Then in 1873 the NYB&N and the Harlem Extension merged to form the New York, Boston & Montreal Railroad Company. The D&C would have been part of the main line from near the future Hopewell Junction north to Pine Plains.The Panic of 1873 stopped the construction of these combined lines and the NYB&M went bankrupt, followed by the D&C in 1874.

"The Never Did and Couldn't"
The ND&C was built as the Dutchess and Columbia railroad under the guidance of George H. Brown of Millbrook. The grand idea was to construct a line to ferry material across the Hudson River from the Erie Railroad's Newburgh Branch across the river at Newburgh and carry it into Connecticut, while also serving the farms and quarries of Dutchess County.

The D&C was sold on August 5, 1876 and reorganized January 25, 1877 as the Newburgh, Dutchess and Connecticut Railroad. To tap the Pennsylvania coal traffic, the D&C built a ferry terminal at Dutchess Junction. In addition to hosting a number of brickyards, at the peak of operations, Dutchess Junction was a thriving town with a train station that served two railroads, the ND&C Railroad and the NYC&HR Railroad. There was also a ferry and freight dock for Hudson River boat traffic. The ND&C Railroad repair shops were located at Dutchess Junction. Workers lived in tenement houses owned by the railroad. Descriptions of the ND&C facilities include a locomotive repair shop, a carpenter shop, brass foundry, paint shop, car repair and build shop, coal and water facilities plus a turntable with a roundhouse and train yard. Adjacent to the ND&C Railroad property was a brick manufacturing company. Dutchess Junction was a bustling, active community."
 
Railroad cars were transferred across the Hudson River to connect with the Erie Railroad in Newburgh. There was also passenger and general freight service using Hudson River steamboats and barges. Stations along the line were built from the same set of plans and looked alike. Standard station colors were yellow with brown trim around the windows and doors. Station roofs were made of slate to combat the ever-present danger of fire from sparks from locomotive smokestacks.

A steamboat shuttled freight and passengers back and forth across the river to and from Newburgh. Loads of coal from the Delaware and Hudson Canal came down the river from Rondout Landing near Kingston, New York and were transferred from barges to train cars at the long dock. On January 1, 1889, the Poughkeepsie Railroad Bridge opened, making the car float operation less useful. In 1905 the New York, New Haven and Hartford Railroad acquired the ND&C, and in 1907 merged it into the Central New England Railway, part of the NYNH&H system. In 1916 the line to Dutchess Junction was abandoned, leaving only the line into Beacon at the south end.

The first main line abandonment was from Shekomeko (about halfway from Pine Plains to Millerton) east to Millerton, abandoned in 1925. In 1935 came the abandonment of the part from Shekomeko west to Pine Plains. In 1938 both remaining sections north of Hopewell Junction were abandoned - from the junction north to Pine Plains and from Millerton east to the Connecticut state line.

The New York, New Haven and Hartford Railroad was merged into Penn Central in 1969; by then the former ND&C was known as the Beacon Secondary Track. After the Poughkeepsie Bridge closed on May 8, 1974 due to fire, the former Dutchess County Railroad was abandoned west of Hopewell Junction, and the former ND&C, as well as the former New York and New England Railroad (then the Maybrook Line), became the Danbury Secondary Track. Conrail acquired Penn Central in 1976, including the remaining part of the ND&C. The remaining part of the line from Hopewell Junction to Beacon is now owned by the Metro-North Railroad as part of its Beacon Line. As of 2021, Metro-North has filed for Federal permission to abandon its entire owned trackage from Beacon, NY to the Connecticut state line.

Station listing
Stations along original D&C line are shaded in darker gray.

References

Twenty-five Years on the ND&C by Bernard L. Rudberg

External links

Photos of former ND&C station in LaGrange
Haight, Lyndon A., Pine Plains and the Railroad
Newburgh, Dutchess and Connecticut Railroad on Google Maps

Companies affiliated with the Central New England Railway
Defunct New York (state) railroads
Transportation in Dutchess County, New York
Predecessors of the New York, New Haven and Hartford Railroad
Railway companies established in 1877
Railway companies disestablished in 1907
American companies disestablished in 1907
American companies established in 1877